The Saskatchewan Party is a right-wing political party in the Canadian province of Saskatchewan. Since 2007, it has been the province's governing party; both the party and the province are currently led by Premier Scott Moe. The party was established in 1997 by a coalition of former provincial Progressive Conservative and Liberal party members and supporters who sought to remove the Saskatchewan New Democratic Party (NDP) from power.

The Saskatchewan Party served as the province's Official Opposition until the provincial election on November 7, 2007. The Saskatchewan Party won 38 seats in the Legislative Assembly, and leader Brad Wall was sworn in as the province's 14th Premier on November 21, 2007. During the November 7, 2011 general election, the party won a landslide victory, winning 49 of 58 seats – the third largest majority government in Saskatchewan's history. On April 4, 2016, the party won a third consecutive mandate, capturing 51 of 61 seats, and became the first non-social-democratic party to win three consecutive elections since 1925.

In the 2020 provincial election, the Saskatchewan Party under Moe was re-elected to its fourth majority government.

History

Origins of the party and political basis
Saskatchewan politics has tended towards a two-party system, with third parties enjoying limited political success. For the first 25 years of the province's existence, political power was split between the Saskatchewan Liberal Party in government, with the Conservatives (initially the Provincial Rights Party) in opposition. The emergence of the Co-operative Commonwealth Federation (CCF), forerunner of the NDP – a social democratic political party formed by the coming together of various socialist, agrarian and labour groups under a united front – forced the Liberals to the right. As a result of vote-splitting with the Liberals, the Tories gradually lost ground in the Legislative Assembly, and were shut out of the chamber altogether in 1934.

The Saskatchewan Tories spent the next four decades on the margins of provincial politics. The presence of future Prime Minister John Diefenbaker, who represented a Saskatchewan riding for his entire career, was not enough to reverse this trend. The renamed Progressive Conservative Party of Saskatchewan would not return to the legislature again until 1964, when they won only one seat, only to lose it in 1967. They would not win another seat until 1975.

Between 1944 and 2007 the CCF–NDP won 12 out of 17 provincial elections in Saskatchewan, and formed the government for 47 of those 63 years.

In the late 1970s, the Progressive Conservatives re-emerged as a political force, forming government under Grant Devine for most of the 1980s. However, dissatisfaction with the Conservative government towards the end of the decade resulted in it being soundly defeated by the NDP in 1991. The Conservatives lost almost half of their popular vote and retained only 10 of the 66 seats in the Legislature. A subsequent corruption scandal further weakened the Tories. The Progressive Conservatives lost further ground at the 1995 general election, falling to only five seats. At that same election, the Liberals rebounded to 11 seats and Official Opposition.

The Liberal caucus soon became bogged down in factional disputes, leading a number of Liberals to propose joining forces with the Tories in hopes of providing an alternative to the NDP. The idea had been broached several times from the 1960s onward. However, in 1997, a confidential discussion of such an idea at a Liberal caucus meeting was shouted down by MLA Gerard Aldridge.

On August 8, 1997, the Saskatchewan Party was formed by a coalition of eight MLAs: four former Progressive Conservatives (Dan D'Autremont, Ben Heppner, Don Toth, and PC leader Bill Boyd) and four former Liberals (Bob Bjornerud, June Draude, Rod Gantefoer, and Liberal caucus leader Ken Krawetz). On September 17, the Saskatchewan Party was registered as an official political party. 

However, it did not result in a formal merger between the two parties. While most Tory supporters and members joined the new party, the Progressive Conservative Party was not disbanded. Under Saskatchewan law, a party must run at least 10 candidates to retain its registration. The Tories were believed to have a significant amount of money on hand, and would have had to forfeit their assets to the government if they were ever de-registered. Instead, the Tories essentially went dormant for the next two election cycles; its assets were held in trust while a select group of party members ran paper candidates to keep the party alive.

The Saskatchewan Party attracted fewer defections from the provincial Liberals, who continue to contest elections. Despite this, former Liberal Krawetz was named as interim leader of the new party, and hence remained Leader of the Opposition.

Since the new Saskatchewan Party consisted largely of former Progressive Conservatives, opponents derided it as merely a re-branding of the Progressive Conservatives in an attempt to distance the party from the still-fresh corruption scandal; then-Premier Roy Romanow often referred to the new party as the "Saska-Tories". This view has continued to follow the party.

Elwin Hermanson (1998–2004) 
In 1998, former Reform Party federal house leader Elwin Hermanson was elected the party's first leader. Since Hermanson did not have a seat in the legislature, Krawetz remained as interim parliamentary leader.

Shortly after taking the leadership, Hermanson led the party into the 1999 provincial election. The party had a strong showing, retaking many rural ridings from the NDP. In the process, they won 25 seats, five short of victory, and reduced the NDP to a minority government.

During the 2003 provincial election, the Saskatchewan Party campaigned on a platform of tax reduction and decreased government involvement in the private sector. The party won 28 seats, while the NDP won 30 seats. The party was accused of having undisclosed plans to privatize the province's crown corporations. Hermanson stated he would not sell the four major crown corporations, but would consider offers. The NDP used the ambiguity in the Saskatchewan Party's position to turn the election into a referendum on crown corporation ownership for many voters, and won the one seat it needed to regain a majority government. Hermanson resigned as leader shortly afterward. He stated he had taken the party as far as he could, and it was time for the party to elect a new leader who could take it further.

Brad Wall (2004–2018) 
Brad Wall was acclaimed as the new party leader on March 15, 2004, after being the only declared candidate for the leadership. Other caucus members who expressed interest in running included Jason Dearborn, Allan Kerpan (a former Reform MP), and Ken Cheveldayoff, the MLA for Saskatoon Silver Springs who at one time was the President of the Young Progressive Conservatives of Saskatchewan.

Following his appointment as leader, Wall undertook a review of party policies. He soon unveiled a more moderate policy platform that included plans for more treatment beds for crystal meth addicts, democratic workplaces, and a new model for economic development in Saskatchewan. With significantly revised core policies and increased emphasis on social issues, the party began to soften its image and attract voters in the cities. The party came short of victory in 1999 and 2003 because it had been almost nonexistent outside its rural stronghold. In 1999, it was completely shut out in Regina and won only one seat in Saskatoon. The 2003 election was better; while it picked up two seats in Saskatoon, it was again shut out of Regina. Had 500 votes in Regina Wascana Plains gone to the Saskatchewan Party, it would have resulted in a hung parliament; both the NDP and Saskatchewan Party would have had 29 seats apiece. In response to the results of the 2003 election, the Saskatchewan Party caucus voted in favour of the NDP's Crown Corporations Public Ownership Act, which provided legislative entrenchment for the ownership of the major crown utilities and services.

In 2004, the Saskatchewan Party's aggressive questioning of the provincial NDP government over a bad investment of public funds – SPUDCO – forced cabinet minister Eldon Lautermilch to apologize for misleading the legislature, a fact that only became apparent once sworn evidence was acquired from a civil lawsuit against the province. The party's MLAs requested a public inquiry.

In February 2006, the party released a code of ethics document for its members. It set guidelines for conduct and outlined how to deal with violators. Actions prohibited in this document include disseminating false information, pressuring prospective contributors and offering bribes to other political parties, candidates or voters. Penalties included having the offender's party membership revoked.

In March 2006, the Saskatchewan Party introduced a motion calling on the NDP government to apologize for the highly unfavourable and inaccurate portrayal of Jimmy Gardiner in Prairie Giant: The Tommy Douglas Story. The government has argued it was not responsible for the film's production, and rebuked the motion for an apology.

In 2006, in preparation for the Weyburn-Big Muddy by-election, the Saskatchewan Party was accused of using push polling by attempting to link Liberal leader David Karwacki with the Canadian gun registry. The same poll asked respondents if they linked the Saskatchewan Party with the Progressive Conservative Party of Saskatchewan. On May 16, 2006, in an effort to gain political support, Saskatchewan Party MLAs tried to associate the provincial NDP – which had vocally opposed the gun registry – with their federal party counterparts – which support it.

In 2006 the party released a taxpayer-funded advertisement for the Saskatchewan Party critical of the then-NDP administration. This ad became known for the misspelling of Saskatchewan – as "Saskatchwan". The ad was also criticized for having false information – for example claiming rising tuition costs, despite the government policy of a 3-year freeze in the price of tuition.

On November 23, 2006, the Saskatchewan Party tried to make a political issue about the provincial government trying to reclaim money from tobacco companies for the additional strain smokers placed on the health care system. The NDP government pointed out in response that the Saskatchewan Party had accepted a $10,000 donation from Imperial Tobacco in 2003.

In a by-election held on March 5, 2007, the Saskatchewan Party recaptured the seat in the Legislative Assembly left vacant by the death of Ben Heppner. In a first for Saskatchewan politics, Heppner's daughter – Nancy Heppner – won the seat in both the by-election and the 2007 general election.

In November 2007, the party was sued by the Progressive Conservative Party of Saskatchewan over a trust fund. The PC party alleges the fund's trustees, which contains $2.9 million, conspired with the Saskatchewan Party to deny the PC party access to their funds, and thus not be able to run candidates in the next election. The Saskatchewan Party denies involvement, even though three of the five trustees are active in the Saskatchewan Party.

In the November 7, 2007 general election, the Saskatchewan Party won 38 of the 58 seats in the legislature, allowing it to form the first centre-right government in the province since 1991, and only the third in the province's history. In its first term, the Saskatchewan Party government undertook the largest single-year income tax reduction, debt reduction, and investment in infrastructure in Saskatchewan history, while still maintaining a $1.9 billion cash balance in the Growth and Financial Security Fund.

The Saskatchewan Party government also was successful in lobbying the federal government to block the takeover bid of Potash Corporation of Saskatchewan from Australian mining giant BHP Billiton.

On November 7, 2011 general election, it won a landslide victory, winning 49 of 58 seats. All 18 cabinet ministers were re-elected, and the Saskatchewan Party captured 64.2% of the popular vote en route to the third-biggest majority government (in terms of percentage of seats won) in the province's history. The only bigger majorities came in 1934, when the Liberals won 50 out of 55 seats, and 1982, when the Tories won 55 out of 64. This resulted in the worst election showing for the NDP since 1982. The Saskatchewan Party even managed to unseat NDP leader Dwain Lingenfelter in his own riding.

The party won a third term in 2016.

In February 2017, the land dealings of the Global Transportation Hub (GTH) taken on by The Saskatchewan Party governments of Brad Wall and Scott Moe are under investigation by the Royal Canadian Mounted Police (RCMP) for any wrongdoing or conflicts of interest.

Scott Moe (2018–present) 

Wall announced his retirement from politics on August 10, 2017. He stayed on as leader until a January 2018 leadership election and premier until early February.

At that convention, second-term MLA and former Environment Minister Scott Moe was elected leader on the fifth ballot. He was sworn in as premier on February 2, 2018.

In the 2020 provincial election, the Saskatchewan Party under Moe was re-elected to its fourth majority government.

In October 2022, the party issued a policy paper establishing a stance against "federal intrusion into our exclusive constitutional right to develop our natural resources and grow our economy".

Federal political affiliations
While not officially aligned with any federal political party, some of the Saskatchewan Party's supporters are involved with the Conservative Party of Canada, with others being involved with the Liberal Party of Canada. In the 2004 federal election, Wall endorsed incumbent Conservative David L. Anderson, Member of Parliament for Cypress Hills—Grasslands; that riding includes Swift Current, Wall's hometown.

In the 2006 federal election, Wall stated he supported the Conservative Party, but would not get involved in a federal election. The previous leader, Elwin Hermanson, was a member of the Reform and Canadian Alliance federal parties.

Current and former Saskatchewan Conservative MPs who have been involved with the Saskatchewan Party include Carol Skelton, who served on Elwin Hermanson's constituency executive; Tom Lukiwski, who served as a General Manager of the Saskatchewan Party; Garry Breitkreuz, who supported the formation of the party; and Lynne Yelich, who worked for Allan Kerpan while Kerpan served as MP and received funding from him in the 2006 federal election. 

Warren Steinley and Corey Tochor are Conservative federal MPs, but also served as MLAs for the Saskatchewan Party.

Electoral performance

Party leaders

James Thornsteinson is the party president.

See also
Politics of Saskatchewan
Saskatchewan Party leadership elections

Notes

References

External links
Official website
Caucus website
Constitution of the Saskatchewan Party (2008)
The Canadian Encyclopedia
Crown Corporations Public Ownership Act (official text; PDF)

1997 establishments in Saskatchewan
Conservative parties in Canada
Liberal parties in Canada
Political parties established in 1997
Provincial political parties in Saskatchewan
Organizations based in Regina, Saskatchewan